Harry D. Elkes (28 February 1878 – 30 May 1903) was an American cyclist. He was professional from 1897 until his death in 1903.

Elkes held the world record for "paced-cycle racing" during most of his career and just prior to his fatal accident had achieved a new 5 Miles World Record (going that distance in 6 minutes, 12 1/5 seconds) as well as achieving world's records for 10 and 15 miles. Major Taylor called Elkes in his autobiography "one of the greatest middle-distance riders that ever pedalled a bicycle."

Elkes died in an cycling accident at Charles River Track in Cambridge, Massachusetts, aged 25.

See also
List of racing cyclists and pacemakers with a cycling-related death

References

American male cyclists
American track cyclists
1878 births
1903 deaths
People from Port Henry, New York
Track cyclists